William Lauderdale  (c. 1782-1838) was an American planter-soldier from a prominent Virginia family. He served in both the War of 1812 and the Seminole Wars.

Early life 
William Lauderdale was born around 1782, the third son of Sarah and James Lauderdale in Virginia. James Lauderdale had served in the Continental Army during the Revolutionary War, and as payment for his service, was given a land grant in the frontier of Tennessee. The Lauderdale family was descended from the Scottish Maitland-Lauderdale family, and claimed to be related to Robert the Bruce and William Wallace. William’s grandfather, James Maitland Lauderdale Sr., was the son of Scottish Earl of Lauderdale, and had immigrated to the American colonies in 1714. 

Soon after his birth, Samuel moved his family to Sumner County, Tennessee, where William grew up. He eventually married and had five children. William became a planter and operated a plantation in and lived most of his adult life at his Goose Creek plantation west of Hartsville, TN. Williams lived near the plantation owned by Andrew Jackson, and the two became friends.

Military service

War of 1812 
Lauderdale first served as a lieutenant under Andrew Jackson when the Tennessee Volunteers were dispatched to New Orleans in 1812. Although the troops were relieved before they encountered any combat, the experience promoted Lauderdale as member of Jackson's inner circle. Lauderdale left his Goose Creek plantation in Hartsville to battle in the Creek War. He became Jackson's chief quartermaster and ultimately led him to the battle of New Orleans in 1815.

Second Seminole War 
Lauderdale served again as a captain during the Second Seminole War. In 1837, Lauderdale led a battalion of Tennessee volunteers to South Florida to search for Seminoles who had survived the Battle of Loxahatchee. He established a post on the New River, which subsequently named Fort Lauderdale.

Death 
Lauderdale died of a pulmonary embolism on May 11, 1837 near Baton Rouge, Louisiana. At his funeral, one witness reported, "In the presence of a riderless horse, the band played, colors were presented, and a barrage of artillery and muskets fired a salute."

Legacy 
The accomplishments of Major Lauderdale and the Tennessee Volunteers are memorialized by two historical markers placed near Jupiter, Florida. A statue of the military officer, sculpted and bronzed by a West Palm Beach artist was unveiled in William Lauderdale Park in 1988 to mark the 150th anniversary of the Battle of Pine Island, and a military outpost called "Fort Lauderdale" in Broward County.

Fort Lauderdale, Florida, is named after him.

References 

1837 deaths
American militia officers
American military personnel of the War of 1812
People from Botetourt County, Virginia
People from Sumner County, Tennessee
United States Army personnel of the Seminole Wars